Birmingham Royal Ballet (BRB) is one of the five major ballet companies of the United Kingdom, alongside The Royal Ballet, the English National Ballet, Northern Ballet and Scottish Ballet. Founded as the Sadler's Wells Theatre Ballet, the company was established in 1946 as a sister company to the earlier Sadler's Wells company, which moved to the Royal Opera House that same year, subsequently becoming known as The Royal Ballet.

The new company was formed under the direction of John Field and remained at Sadler's Wells for many years, becoming known as the Sadler's Wells Royal Ballet in 1977. It also toured the UK and abroad, before relocating to Birmingham in 1990, where it uses the Birmingham Hippodrome stage when performing in the city. Birmingham Royal Ballet has extensive custom-built facilities, including a suite of dance studios, the Jerwood Centre for the Prevention and Treatment of Dance Injuries and a studio theatre known as the Patrick Centre. In 1997, the Birmingham Royal Ballet became independent of The Royal Ballet in London.

History
In 1926, the Irish-born dancer Ninette de Valois founded the Academy of Choreographic Art, a dance school for girls. Her intention was to form a repertory ballet company and school, leading her to collaborate with the English theatrical producer and theatre owner Lilian Baylis. Baylis owned the Old Vic and Sadler's Wells theatres, and in 1925, she engaged de Valois to stage dance performances at both venues.

Sadler's Wells reopened in 1931, and the Vic-Wells Ballet and Vic-Wells Ballet School were established in premises at the theatre. These would become the predecessors of today's Royal Ballet, Birmingham Royal Ballet and Royal Ballet School.

In 1939, the company lost its link with the Old Vic theatre, and in 1940, Sadler's Wells theatre was bombed during World War II. These events forced the company to begin touring the country, becoming known as the Sadler's Wells Ballet. The company did return to Sadler's Wells theatre, where it stayed until 1946, when the company was invited to become the resident ballet company of the newly re-opened Royal Opera House in Covent Garden. The company relocated to the opera house the same year in 1946, with their first production at the venue being Ninette de Valois' staging of The Sleeping Beauty.

Following the relocation of the company, the school was relocated to its own premises in 1947, and a sister company was established to continue performances at Sadler's Wells, called Sadler's Wells Theatre Ballet. This sister company would become the predecessor of today's Birmingham Royal Ballet. The first Artistic Director of the Sadler's Wells Theatre Ballet was John Field, who was later made co-director of the Royal Ballet and also worked as artistic director of La Scala Theatre Ballet and English National Ballet.

In 1955, Sadler's Wells Theatre Ballet temporarily lost its link with Sadler's Wells theatre and relocated to the Royal Opera House as a touring unit of the main company.

In 1956, a Royal Charter was granted for both companies and the school, and they were subsequently renamed the Royal Ballet, Sadler's Wells Royal Ballet and the Royal Ballet School.

The Sadler's Wells Royal Ballet returned to Sadler's Wells theatre in 1970, whilst continuing to tour the country. The first indication that the company would leave London came in 1987, when the company was invited to become the resident ballet company at the Birmingham Hippodrome theatre. Consequently, the company relocated to Birmingham in 1990, being given its current name Birmingham Royal Ballet.

Sir Peter Wright was the company's Artistic Director from 1977 until his retirement in 1995, when David Bintley was appointed Artistic Director. In 1997, Birmingham Royal Ballet was made independent of the Royal Ballet and ceased to be managed by the Royal Opera House. In January 2019 it was announced that acclaimed Cuban dancer Carlos Acosta would succeed Bintley as artistic director in January 2020.

Works performed

Dancers

Principals

First Soloists
Kit Holder
Yvette Knight
Rory Mackay
Miki Mizutani
Valentin Olovyannikov
Jonathan Payn
Yaoqian Shang

Soloists
Laura Day
Karla Doorbar
Yu Kurihara
Max Maslen
Lachlan Monaghan
Beatrice Parma
Yijing Zhang

First Artists
Haoliang Feng
Reina Fuchigami
Gus Payne
Rachele Pizillo
Alys Shee
Edivaldo Souza da Silva
Daria Stanciulescu

Artists

Gabriel Anderson
Louis Andreasen
Enrique Bejarano Vidal
Alexandra Burman
Anna Ciriano
Rosanna Ely
Ryan Felix
Callum Findlay-White
Tori Forsyth-Hecken
August Generalli
Miles Gilliver
Josue Gomez Sarria
Tessa Hogge
Isabella Howard
Regan Hutsell
Sofia Liñares
Eric Pinto Cata
Emma Price
Matilde Rodrigues
Javier Rojas
Hamish Scott
Eilis Small
Lennert Steegan
Yuki Sugiura
Lynsey Sutherland
Amelia Thompson
Lucy Waine
Shuailun Wu
Alexander Yap

Apprentices
Hannah Martin

See also
The Royal Ballet, sister company of the Birmingham Royal Ballet
Royal Ballet School, official ballet school of the company
English National Ballet
Elmhurst Ballet School

Footnotes

External links

Birmingham Royal Ballet tour blog

 
The Royal Ballet
Schools of the performing arts in the United Kingdom
Ballet schools in the United Kingdom
Culture in Birmingham, West Midlands
National Dance Award winners
1947 establishments in England
Performing groups established in 1946